Pelhřimov District is a district in the Vysočina Region of the Czech Republic. Its capital is the town of Pelhřimov.

Administrative division
Pelhřimov District is divided into three administrative districts of municipalities with extended competence: Pelhřimov, Humpolec and Pacov.

List of municipalities
Towns are marked in bold and market towns in italics:

Arneštovice -
Bácovice -
Bělá -
Bohdalín -
Bořetice -
Bořetín -
Božejov -
Bratřice -
Budíkov -
Buřenice -
Bystrá -
Čáslavsko -
Častrov -
Čejov -
Čelistná -
Černov -
Černovice -
Červená Řečice -
Cetoraz -
Chýstovice -
Chyšná -
Čížkov -
Dehtáře -
Dobrá Voda -
Dobrá Voda u Pacova -
Dubovice -
Důl -
Eš -
Hojanovice -
Hojovice -
Horní Cerekev -
Horní Rápotice -
Horní Ves -
Hořepník -
Hořice -
Humpolec -
Jankov -
Ježov -
Jiřice -
Kaliště -
Kámen -
Kamenice nad Lipou -
Kejžlice -
Koberovice -
Kojčice -
Komorovice -
Košetice -
Krasíkovice -
Křeč -
Křelovice -
Křešín -
Leskovice -
Lesná -
Lhota-Vlasenice -
Libkova Voda -
Lidmaň -
Litohošť -
Lukavec -
Martinice u Onšova -
Mezilesí -
Mezná -
Mladé Bříště -
Mnich -
Moraveč -
Mysletín -
Nová Buková -
Nová Cerekev -
Nový Rychnov -
Obrataň -
Olešná -
Ondřejov -
Onšov -
Pacov -
Pavlov -
Pelhřimov -
Píšť -
Počátky -
Polesí -
Pošná -
Proseč -
Proseč pod Křemešníkem -
Putimov -
Řečice -
Rodinov -
Rovná -
Rynárec -
Salačova Lhota -
Samšín -
Sedlice -
Senožaty -
Staré Bříště -
Stojčín -
Střítež -
Střítež pod Křemešníkem -
Svépravice -
Syrov -
Těchobuz -
Těmice -
Ústrašín -
Útěchovice -
Útěchovice pod Stražištěm -
Útěchovičky -
Včelnička -
Velká Chyška -
Velký Rybník -
Veselá -
Věžná -
Vojslavice -
Vokov -
Vyklantice -
Vyskytná -
Vysoká Lhota -
Vystrkov -
Zachotín -
Zajíčkov -
Želiv -
Zhořec -
Žirov -
Žirovnice -
Zlátenka

Geography

The landscape is very rugged, with an average altitude mostly between 550 and 600 m. The climate of the district is harsh and cold for most of the year. Almost entire territory lies in the geomorphological mesoregion of Křemešník Highlands, only a small part in the southeast belongs into the Křižanov Highlands.

There are only small river. The most important river is the Želivka, which springs here and flows to the north. In the south flows the Kamenice, a tributary of the Nežárka. The southernmost part of Švihov Reservoir, one of the largest reservoirs in the country built on the Želivka, is located in the northern part of the district. A notable body of water in the district is also Trnávka Reservoir.

There are no protected landscape areas, only small-scale protected areas.

Demographics

Most populated municipalities

Economy
The largest employers with its headquarters in Pelhřimov District and at least 500 employers are:

Transport
The D1 motorway from Prague to Brno passes through the northern part of the district.

Sights

The most important monuments in the district, protected as national cultural monuments, are:
Želiv Monastery
Červená Řečice Castle

The best-preserved settlements, protected as monument reservations and monument zones, are:
Pelhřimov (monument reservation)
Červená Řečice
Kamenice nad Lipou
Pacov
Počátky
Zhoř

The most visited tourist destination is the Museum of Records and Curiosities in Pelhřimov.

References

External links

Pelhřimov District profile on the Czech Statistical Office's website

 
Districts of the Czech Republic